Daniel Kevin DeMent (born June 17, 1978) is an American professional baseball hitting coach for the Tampa Bay Rays of Major League Baseball.

DeMent is from Frankfort, Illinois. He attended Providence Catholic High School in New Lenox, Illinois, and then spent two years at Rend Lake College before he transferred to the University of Alabama at Birmingham (UAB) to play college baseball for the UAB Blazers baseball. After he graduated from UAB, DeMent signed with the Tampa Bay Rays as an undrafted free agent in 2000. He played in Minor League Baseball for the Rays and Washington Nationals. After the 2007 season, he transitioned into coaching. The Rays promoted DeMent to their major league coaching staff after the 2021 season.

References

External links

1978 births
Living people
People from Frankfort, Illinois
Baseball players from Illinois
Baseball coaches from Illinois
UAB Blazers baseball players
Tampa Bay Rays coaches
Major League Baseball hitting coaches
Bakersfield Blaze players
Charleston RiverDogs players
Harrisburg Senators players
Montgomery Biscuits players
New Orleans Zephyrs players
Orlando Rays players
Princeton Devil Rays players